The Astore Valley (el. ) is a valley located in the Astore District of Gilgit-Baltistan, Pakistan.

History
According to The Imperial Gazetteer of India, around 1600:

See also
 Nasirabad (Hunza)
 Rupal Valley
 Tarishing
 Nanga Parbat

References

Astore District